Ağbənd is a town in the Zangilan District of Azerbaijan close to the point at which the borders of Azerbaijan, Armenia and Iran form a politically sensitive junction.

History
Until October 1993, livestock raising and the cultivation of agricultural crops were the main activities of the village. There was a club, a library and a first-aid post. The village came under the control of ethnic Armenian forces in October 1993 during the First Nagorno-Karabakh War. Located in the Armenian-occupied territories surrounding Nagorno-Karabakh, the village subsequently became part of the self-proclaimed Republic of Artsakh as part of its Kashatagh Province, referred to as Aghopen. 

It was recaptured by Azerbaijan on 22 October 2020 during the Aras Valley campaign in the 2020 Nagorno-Karabakh war, which completed the takeover of the Azerbaijan-Iran border.

References

Populated places in Zangilan District